L-13 Light Industrial Workshop is a contemporary art studio and publisher that opened in May 2009 in Clerkenwell, London. Operated by Steve Lowe, it is a revised incarnation of his previous galleries and small presses, ‘the aquarium’ and The Aquarium L-13, and works with a small group of artists known for their unorthodox stances, in developing, exhibiting and publishing their work.

Name

"L-13" is the name of the zeppelin that left a trail of bombs across Clerkenwell in 1915. One of which destroyed the building at L-13’s previous site on Farringdon Road

Description

L-13 claims it "is a creative platform, spiritual home and technical epicentre for a small group of artists that Lowe has found himself working with - both in collaborative venture and by way of support for the individual artists ... We are also physical home to the Harry Adams / STOT21stCplanB / NOT Banksy studio, an 1825 Albion Press, The Patented Finger of God Painting Machine and a miniature poodle known as The Beast. We develop creative projects both ambitious and diminutive: publish books, make prints & other artwork editions; convert impractical artistic visions to reality; and promote a playful polemic spirit in all we do.".

The L-13 HQ is an underground space off Clerkenwell Road where they used to stage exhibitions but is now used only as a studio space for the production of their artworks and publications, and the organisation of artist's projects. 

When still operating as an exhibition space it was described as "Part swish contemporary gallery, part subversive socio-political vision, part artists' studio and part members' club" by the Urban Junkies website.

The L-13 artists are Jamie Reid, Billy Childish, Jimmy Cauty, Harry Adams and STOT21stCplanB.

Projects

Jimmy Cauty ADP World Riot Tour and MdZ ESTATE Tour + publications
Merchants of Death Merchandise for K2 Plant Hire Ltd 
Billy Childish exhibitions and publications
Jamie Reid publications
Harry Adams studio, exhibitions and publications
STOT21stCplanB studio, exhibitions and publications
Not Banksy studio, publications and project management

Notes and references

See also

Billy Childish
The Aquarium L-13
Jimmy Cauty
The KLF
Jamie Reid

External links

The Art of Distraction

Art museums and galleries in London
Art galleries established in 2009
2009 establishments in England
Clerkenwell